In mathematics, the Weyl character formula in representation theory describes the characters of irreducible representations of compact Lie groups in terms of their highest weights. There is a closely related formula for the character of an irreducible representation of a semisimple Lie algebra. In Weyl's approach to the representation theory of connected compact Lie groups, the proof of the character formula is a key step in proving that every dominant integral element actually arises as the highest weight of some irreducible representation. Important consequences of the character formula are the Weyl dimension formula and the Kostant multiplicity formula. 

The irreducible representations in this case are all finite-dimensional (this is part of the Peter–Weyl theorem); so the notion of trace is the usual one from linear algebra. Knowledge of the character  of  gives a lot of information about  itself. 

Weyl's formula is a closed formula for the character , in terms of other objects constructed from G and its Lie algebra.

Statement of Weyl character formula
The character formula can be expressed in terms of representations of complex semisimple Lie algebras or in terms of the (essentially equivalent) representation theory of compact Lie groups.

Complex semisimple Lie algebras

Let  be an irreducible, finite-dimensional representation of a complex semisimple Lie algebra .

By elementary considerations, the character may be computed as
,
(The preceding expression is sometimes taken as the definition of the character.)

The character formula states that  may also be computed as

 

where
  is the Weyl group;
  is the set of the positive roots of the root system ;
  is the half-sum of the positive roots, often called the Weyl vector;
  is the highest weight of the irreducible representation ;

Discussion
Using the Weyl denominator formula (described below), the character formula may be rewritten as
 ,
or, equivalently,
 
The character is itself a large sum of exponentials. In this last expression, we then multiply the character by an alternating sum of exponentials—which seemingly will result in an even larger sum of exponentials. The surprising part of the character formula is that when we compute this product, only a small number of terms actually remain. Many more terms than this occur at least once in the product of the character and the Weyl denominator, but most of these terms cancel out to zero.

Compact Lie groups

,
 
Weyl's proof of the character formula in the compact group setting is completely different from the algebraic proof of the character formula in the setting of semisimple Lie algebras.

The SU(2) case
In the case of the group SU(2), consider the irreducible representation of dimension . If we take  to be the diagonal subgroup of SU(2), the character formula in this case reads

(Both numerator and denominator in the character formula have two terms.) It is instructive to verify this formula directly in this case, so that we can observe the cancellation phenomenon implicit in the Weyl character formula. 

Since the representations are known very explicitly, the character of the representation can be written down as

The Weyl denominator, meanwhile, is simply the function . Multiplying the character by the Weyl denominator gives

We can now easily verify that most of the terms cancel between the two term on the right-hand side above, leaving us with only

so that

Weyl denominator formula

In the special case of the trivial 1-dimensional representation the character is 1, so the Weyl character formula becomes the Weyl denominator formula:

 

For special unitary groups, this is equivalent to the expression
 
for the Vandermonde determinant.

Weyl dimension formula

 
for the dimension
of a finite dimensional representation  with highest weight . (As usual, ρ is half the sum of the positive roots and the products run over positive roots α.) The specialization is not completely trivial, because both
the numerator and denominator of the Weyl character formula vanish to high order at the identity element, so it is necessary to take a limit of the trace of an element tending to the identity, using a version of L'Hospital's rule.

We may consider as an example the complex semisimple Lie algebra sl(3,C), or equivalently the compact group SU(3). In that case, the representations are labeled by a pair  of non-negative integers. In this case, there are three positive roots and it is not hard to verify that the dimension formula takes the explicit form

The case  is the standard representation and indeed the dimension formula gives the value 3 in this case.

Kostant multiplicity formula

The Weyl character formula gives the character of each representation as a quotient, where the numerator and denominator are each a finite linear combination of exponentials. While this formula in principle determines the character, it is not especially obvious how one can compute this quotient explicitly as a finite sum of exponentials. Already In the SU(2) case described above, it is not immediately obvious how to go from the Weyl character formula, which gives the character as  back to the formula for the character as a sum of exponentials:

In this case, it is perhaps not terribly difficult to recognize the expression  as the sum of a finite geometric series, but in general we need a more systematic procedure.

In general, the division process can be accomplished by computing a formal reciprocal of the Weyl denominator and then multiplying the numerator in the Weyl character formula by this formal reciprocal. The result gives the character as a finite sum of exponentials. The coefficients of this expansion are the dimensions of the weight spaces, that is, the multiplicities of the weights. We thus obtain from the Weyl character formula a formula for the multiplicities of the weights, known as the Kostant multiplicity formula. An alternative formula, that is more computationally tractable in some cases, is given in the next section.

Freudenthal's formula

Hans Freudenthal's formula is a recursive formula for the weight multiplicities that gives the same answer as the Kostant multiplicity formula, but is sometimes
easier to use for calculations as there can be far fewer terms to sum. The formula is based on use of the Casimir element and its derivation is independent of the character formula. 
It states

 

where

 Λ is a highest weight,
 λ is some other weight,
 mΛ(λ) is the multiplicity of the weight λ in the irreducible representation VΛ
 ρ is the Weyl vector
 The first sum is over all positive roots α.

Weyl–Kac character formula
The Weyl character formula also holds for integrable highest-weight representations of Kac–Moody algebras, when it is known as the Weyl–Kac character formula. Similarly there is a denominator identity for Kac–Moody algebras, which in the case of the affine Lie algebras is equivalent to the Macdonald identities. In the simplest case of the affine Lie algebra of type A1 this is the Jacobi triple product identity

 

The character formula can also be extended to integrable highest weight representations of generalized Kac–Moody algebras, when the character is given by

 

Here S is a correction term given in terms of the imaginary simple roots by

 

where the sum runs over all finite subsets I of the imaginary simple roots which are pairwise orthogonal and orthogonal to the highest weight λ, and |I| is the cardinality of I and ΣI is the sum of the elements of I.

The denominator formula for the monster Lie algebra is the product formula

 

for the elliptic modular function j.

Peterson gave a recursion formula for the multiplicities mult(β) of the roots β of a symmetrizable (generalized) Kac–Moody algebra, which is equivalent to the Weyl–Kac denominator formula, but easier to use for calculations:

 

where the sum is over positive roots γ, δ, and

Harish-Chandra Character Formula

Harish-Chandra showed that Weyl's character formula admits a generalization to representations of a real, reductive group. Suppose  is an irreducible, admissible representation of a real, reductive group G with infinitesimal character . If H is a Cartan subgroup of G and H' is the set of regular elements in H, then

 

Here
and the rest of the notation is as above.

The coefficients  are still not well understood. Results on these coefficients may be found in papers of Herb, Adams, Schmid, and Schmid-Vilonen among others.

See also 
 Character theory
 Algebraic character
 Demazure character formula
 Weyl integration formula

References

 Fulton, William and Harris, Joe (1991). Representation theory: a first course. New York: Springer-Verlag. . OCLC 22861245.
 
 .
 Infinite dimensional Lie algebras, V. G. Kac, 
 
 
 
 

Representation theory of Lie groups